Mother Hen may refer to:
Mother Hen, a 1971 album by Jane Getz
 "Mother Hen", a song from the 2014 album Hyperborea by Flamingods
 "Mother Hen", a song from the 2017 album Through The Roof by St James in the City
 "Mother Hen", a nickname for Melissa Ong